Getchell Creek is a stream in Stearns County, in the U.S. state of Minnesota.

Getchell Creek was named for Nathaniel Getchell, an early settler.

See also
List of rivers of Minnesota

References

Rivers of Stearns County, Minnesota
Rivers of Minnesota